Rio Piracicaba is a Brazilian municipality located in the state of Minas Gerais. The city belongs to the mesoregion Metropolitana de Belo Horizonte and to the microregion of Itabira. It has two rural districts: Conceição de Piracicaba (better known as "Jorge") and Padre Pinto (better known as "Caxambu).  As of 2020, the estimated population was 14,332.

References

See also
 List of municipalities in Minas Gerais

Municipalities in Minas Gerais